This is a list of people who have served as Lord Lieutenant of Westmeath.

There were lieutenants of counties in Ireland until the reign of James II, when they were renamed governors. The office of Lord Lieutenant was recreated on 23 August 1831.

Governors

 George Forbes, 3rd Earl of Granard: 1740-1756 
 George Rochfort, 2nd Earl of Belvedere: 1772–1815
 George Nugent, 7th Earl of Westmeath: –1814
 Gustavus Hume Rochfort: 1815–1824
 William Handcock, 1st Viscount Castlemaine: 1824–1831
 George Nugent, 1st Marquess of Westmeath: –1831

Lord Lieutenants
 The 1st Marquess of Westmeath: 7 October 1831 – April 1871
 The 1st Baron Greville: 3 April 1871 – 26 January 1883
 Sir Benjamin Chapman, 4th Baronet: 28 March 1883 – 3 November 1888
 The 4th Baron Castlemaine: 14 January 1889 – 26 April 1892
 Francis Travers Dames-Longworth: 13 June 1892 – 3 December 1898
 The 5th Baron Castlemaine: 26 May 1899 – 1922

References

Westmeath